Rafael Ernesto Iglesias (born 10 December 1905, date of death unknown) was a sailor from Argentina, who represented his country at the 1928 Summer Olympics and the 1936 Summer Olympics.

References

Sources
 

Argentine male sailors (sport)
Sailors at the 1928 Summer Olympics – 8 Metre
Sailors at the 1936 Summer Olympics – 8 Metre
Olympic sailors of Argentina
1905 births
Year of death missing